Since its opening in 1994, the United Center in Chicago, Illinois, has hosted many local, regional and international artists, spanning a wide range of musical genres. A list of notable concerts are given in the table below, with other non-concert entertainment events also included. All events are arranged in a chronological order.

1990s

2000s

2010s

2020s

Notes

References

External links
 United Center – Events Summary
 United Center – Events Calendar

Entertainment events at United Center, the
Entertainment events at United Center, the
Entertainment events in the United States
Events in Chicago
Lists of events by venue
Lists of events in the United States